The Convention on the Conservation of Antarctic Marine Living Resources, also known as the Commission for the Conservation of Antarctic Marine Living Resources, and CCAMLR, is part of the Antarctic Treaty System.

The convention was opened for signature on 1 August 1980 and entered into force on 7 April 1982 by the Commission for the Conservation of Antarctic Marine Living Resources, headquartered in Tasmania, Australia. The goal is to preserve marine life and environmental integrity in and near Antarctica.

It was established in large part to concerns that an increase in krill catches in the Southern Ocean could have a serious impact on populations of other marine life which are dependent upon krill for food.

In 1989, CCAMLR set up the Ecosystem Monitoring Program (CEMP) to further monitor the effects of fishing and harvesting of species in the area.

On 19 October 2022, Ecuador became a New Member of the Commission, the 26th member of the CCAMLR.

Member states

Marine Protected Areas (MPAs) 
In 2009, the Commission agreed by consensus to creating a representative network of MPAs by 2012. It was the first international body to do this based on recommendations from the United Nations World Summit on Sustainable Development. In 2011, it identified nine planning domains within which to designate these protected areas.

South Orkneys MPA 
In 2009, the Commission agreed by consensus to establish the world's first high-seas MPA to protect ocean surrounding the South Orkney Islands in the south Atlantic Ocean.

It was proposed by the United Kingdom and covers 94,000 km2. It came into force in May 2010.

Ross Sea MPA 
In 2010, a proposal for an MPA in the Ross Sea were put forward by both the US and New Zealand. These were later combined as a joint proposal.

In July 2013, the Commission held a special meeting in Bremerhaven to consider proposals for MPAs in both the Ross Sea and East Antarctica. Consensus was not reached after Russia voted against the proposals, citing uncertainty about whether the commission had the authority to establish a protected area.

On 28 October 2016, after several years of scientific and diplomatic discussions, the Commission agreed by consensus to designate the Ross Sea marine protected area at its annual meeting in Hobart. The protected area covers 1.55 million square kilometers of ocean, of which 72% is a no-take zone. The remaining 28% include some harvesting of fish and krill for the purpose of scientific research.

The Ross Sea MPA will be in force for 35 years. At the end of its review period in 2052, CCAMLR Members must agree by consensus to renew or modify it as needed.

East Antarctic MPA 
In 2010, Australia, France and the European Union submitted a proposal for an MPA in East Antarctica. It originally included seven representative areas with varying degrees of protection and covered 1.8 million square kilometers of ocean. By 2017, these were scaled back to three areas covering just under 1 million square kilometres. This was due to the political concerns and economic interests expressed by some Member states. The proposal was also amended to include an expiration of 30 years after designation and the ability to review its monitoring and management every ten years. It has been under consideration by the Commission since 2012.

References

External links
Convention on the Conservation of Antarctic Marine Living Resources
CCAMLR Convention text

Antarctica agreements
Cold War treaties
Environmental treaties
Fisheries treaties
Treaties concluded in 1980
Treaties entered into force in 1982
1982 in Antarctica
Environment of Antarctica
1982 in the environment
Treaties of Argentina
Treaties of Australia
Treaties of Belgium
Treaties of Brazil
Treaties of Bulgaria
Treaties of Canada
Treaties of Chile
Treaties of the People's Republic of China
Treaties of the Cook Islands
Treaties of Finland
Treaties of France
Treaties of West Germany
Treaties of Greece
Treaties of India
Treaties of Italy
Treaties of Japan
Treaties of South Korea
Treaties of Mauritius
Treaties of Namibia
Treaties of the Netherlands
Treaties of New Zealand
Treaties of Norway
Treaties of Pakistan
Treaties of Peru
Treaties of Panama
Treaties of the Polish People's Republic
Treaties of the Soviet Union
Treaties of South Africa
Treaties of Spain
Treaties of Sweden
Treaties of Ukraine
Treaties of the United Kingdom
Treaties of the United States
Treaties of Uruguay
Treaties of Vanuatu
Treaties entered into by the European Union
Treaties of East Germany
Animal treaties
Intergovernmental organizations established by treaty
International organisations based in Australia